Travis Somerville (born 1963) is an American artist based in San Francisco, California. Known for tackling Southern racial issues, Somerville’s works incorporate collage  painting and sculptural elements, as well as site-specific installations.

Early life and education 
Somerville was born in Atlanta, Georgia in 1963. His parents, both European American, were civil rights activists, his father worked as an Episcopal preacher and his mother was a schoolteacher. Somerville grew up in various cities and rural towns throughout the Southern United States. He briefly studied at Maryland Institute College of Art (MICA), Baltimore, Maryland, finally settling in San Francisco in 1984 where he attended the San Francisco Art Institute (SFAI).

Work 
Somerville’s work simultaneously tries to reconcile his personal struggle with his own Southern Christian upbringing and the overt tumultuous racial politics of then with the mixed messaging backlash of now. Using collaged and painted pictorial elements, he summons imagery and words from the history, politics, popular culture, and fine art into juxtapositions that challenge conventional lines of history and social perceptions.
For example, his piece, Boy in the Hood, 2000, portrays Malcolm X wearing a Ku Klux Klan hood. In an interview with Nathan Larramendy, Somerville stated, “My southern identity will always play a part in my work because that is who I am... I feel
the overall theme [of my work] is oppression and greed. I want the oppressed to be validated and the oppressors to be guilty. I want people to realize that we are all connected in some way and we are responsible for each other.”

Awards 
 2000 The Art Council Grant
 Artist in Residence, University of Houston–Clear Lake — Houston, Texas (USA)
2010 – Painters & Sculptors Grant recipient, Joan Mitchell Foundation
2018 – Artist in Residence (served in 2018, awarded in 2016),  Joan Mitchell Foundation

Public collections 

 21c Museum hotels, Louisville, Kentucky
 The Achenbach Collection of the Fine Arts Museums of San Francisco (FAMSF), San Francisco, California
 di Rosa, Napa, California
 Laguna Art Museum, Laguna Beach, California
 Progressive Art Collection, Mayfield Village, Ohio
 San Jose Museum of Art, San Jose, California 
 Walker Art Center, Minneapolis, Minnesota 
 San Francisco Museum of Modern Art, San Francisco, California

Select solo exhibitions 
2010 Museum of Contemporary Art, Boulder, Colorado
2009 Dedicated to the Proposition, Ben Maltz Gallery, Otis College of Art and Design, Los Angeles, California
2008 Authentic Facsimiles of a Nation, Caren Golden Fine Art Gallery, New York, New York
2007 The Great American Let Down, Overtones Gallery, Los Angeles, California
2006 American Cracker Too, Alfred C. Glassell Jr. Exhibition Gallery, Louisiana State University, Baton Rouge, Louisiana American Cracker, Catharine Clark Gallery, San Francisco, California Peckerwood Nation, Nathan Larramendy Gallery, Ojai, California
2004 More Songs of the South, Nathan Larramendy Gallery, Ojai, California
2003 More Songs of the South, Catharine Clark Gallery, San Francisco, California (catalogue)
2002 Another Song of the South, University of Georgia, Athens, Georgia
2000 Song of the South, Catharine Clark Gallery, San Francisco, California Travis Somerville: New Work, University of Houston-Clear Lake, Houston, Texas (catalogue)
1998 The Land of Cotton, Catharine Clark Gallery, San Francisco, California
1996 I’ve Never Been to Aceldama: New Work (125th San Francisco Art Institute Anniversary Exhibit), Catharine Clark Gallery, San Francisco, California
1994 Introductions, Morphos Gallery, San Francisco, California
1993 Travis Somerville, Mace, San Francisco, California
1992 Travis Somerville, Mace, San Francisco, California
1991 Travis Somerville, Mace, San Francisco, California Travis Somerville, Show N Tell, San Francisco, California
1990 Travis Somerville, Mace, San Francisco, California
1989 Travis Somerville, 1078 Gallery, Chico, California Travis Somerville, Show N Tell, San Francisco, California

Notes

External links 
 Travis Somerville's page at beta pictoris gallery

American installation artists
1963 births
Living people
Artists from the San Francisco Bay Area
San Francisco Art Institute alumni
Maryland Institute College of Art alumni